Alfa (or Alfa Telecommunications, Arabic: الفا) is a state-owned Lebanese telecom company, founded in 1994, and one of the two operating GSM networks in Lebanon, the other being touch. Previously managed by Orascom TMT, its management had been transferred to the Telecommunications Ministry in 2020.

History
Alfa is the network name for the Mobile Interim Company 1 (MIC1), founded in 1994 under the name of Cellis, managed by France Telecom.

In 2004 the Lebanese government signed a management contract with FAL-DETE to operate the MIC1 network for 4 years. FAL-DETE renamed the Cellis network as Alfa. 

In 2009 Orascom took over management of MIC1.

In March 2010 Marwan Hayek became the CEO of Alfa. From October 2011, Alfa launched Lebanon's first 3G+ technology, and subsequently were also the first operator in Lebanon to introduce 4G-LTE and 4G+ LTE-A technologies.

According to a report from Zain Group in June 2014, Alfa is reported to have 1.8 million subscribers, the numbers having grown significantly with the influx of over a million Syrian refugees in the previous two and half years.

Following the decision by the Lebanese Government to transfer the operations of telecom company to the government. Orascom Telecom and Alfa CEO Marwan Hayek announced on 8 September 2020 the completion of transfer of MIC 1 to the Lebanese government with the majority of the employees signing new agreement directly with the government on 8 and 9 September.  

Shortly after caretaker telecommunications minister Talal Hawat announced a new board of director with Jad Nassif as chairman.

See also
 Touch (Lebanon)

References

External links
 

1994 establishments in Lebanon
Telecommunications companies established in 1994
Telecommunications companies of Lebanon